Lithuania, at the 2006 European Athletics Championships held in Sweden. In this European Championship started 13 athletes who will represented Lithuania.

Medals

Medal table

Medalists

Results

Nations at the 2006 European Athletics Championships
Lithuania at the European Athletics Championships
European Athletics Championships